Motorsports Business Management LLC, operating as MBM Motorsports (and sometimes known as Carl Long Motorsports), is an American professional stock car racing team that currently competes in the NASCAR Cup Series and the NASCAR Xfinity Series. MBM was co-owned and operated by Long and driver Derek White until early 2016, with full operation of the team being taken by Long and his family after White was arrested on smuggling charges.

In the Cup Series the team fields  the No. 66 part-time for TBA. In the Xfinity Series the team fields the No. 13 part-time for Timmy Hill and the No. 66 full-time for multiple drivers.

History
Before the 2014 Drive to Stop Diabetes 300 at Bristol Motor Speedway, Derek White and Carl Long created Motorsports Business Management. In 2016, White was arrested on tobacco smuggling charges, leading to his indefinite suspension by NASCAR. Ownership of the team was transferred to the Long family; officially, the team owner is listed as Long's father, Horace. 

Until the end of the 2018 season, MBM Motorsports ran Dodge cars on a limited basis in addition to the other manufacturers, using engines leased from Team Penske from when Penske ran Dodges. The team switched to Toyotas starting in 2019, and team owner Carl Long appealed to the manufacturer for support.

In November 2021, Long and eight members of his team, including driver David Starr, tested positive for COVID-19 following the 2021 season finale at Phoenix Raceway. That led to Starr reuniting with his former Truck Series team SS-Green Light Racing in the Xfinity Series.

Cup Series

Car No. 13 history

When No. 13 became available following Germain Racing's shutdown, MBM renumbered the car again in 2021. Garrett Smithley attempted the 2021 Daytona 500, but was involved in an accident with Noah Gragson, leading them both to miss the race. The 13 returned at the NASCAR Open at Texas Motor Speedway with David Starr behind the wheel. Starr returned at Nashville and finished 35th. Timmy Hill scored the team's best finish of 27th at Texas.

Car No. 13 results

Car No. 46 history
During the 2018–19 offseason, MBM Motorsports hinted at running a second Cup car at some point in the 2019 season along with the usual No. 66. In late April, the team announced their intention to enter a second car in the Digital Ally 400 at Kansas, leading to Joey Gase driving the No. 46 Camry in the race.

Car No. 46 results

Car No. 49 history
In 2020, this car was renumbered from No. 46 to No. 49. Chad Finchum failed to qualify for the 2020 Daytona 500 after finishing 20th in Duel 1 of the 2020 Bluegreen Vacations Duels. Finchum also drove the No. 49 in the 2020 South Point 400, Hollywood Casino 400 and the 2020 Autotrader EchoPark Automotive 500 with a best finish of 35th.

Car No. 49 results

Car No. 55 history
In 2022, J. J. Yeley attempted to race the Daytona 500 in the No. 55 with sponsor Hex.com, but failed to qualify.

Car No. 55 results

Car No. 66 history

In the offseason, MBM Motorsports bought an HScott Motorsports car. In May 2017, Long announced his intention to field a Monster Energy NASCAR Cup Series car, the No. 66 Chevrolet SS, at Kansas Speedway's Go Bowling 400. The number was selected as a tribute to Mark Thompson, while the paint scheme was nearly identical to the No. 46 car Long drove in the Cup Series before his ban from the Cup garage in 2009; the green and yellow colors remained, though the red roof number was changed to yellow. Although the team received sponsorship from marijuana vaping manufacturer Veedverks, NASCAR prevented the company from appearing on the car after Long mistakenly put the company name wrong in his sponsor submission to NASCAR, spelling it with an "o" instead of a "d"; upon further investigation by NASCAR, the sanctioning body ordered Long to remove the sponsorship. Long missed the first practice session before running 14 laps in the second session, followed by being unable to set a qualifying lap as he was one of 11 cars stuck in inspection during the session. This relegated Long to a 40th-place starting spot, from which he finished 31st.

The No. 66 returned for the AAA 400 Drive for Autism at Dover, though with Timmy Hill at the helm. Hill improved the team's best finish by three positions as he finished 28th. After that race, the team announced that they wouldn't enter in the next races to keep the focus on the Xfinity team. The team returned at Kentucky with Hill; two weeks later, Hill would return in the No. 66 for the Brantley Gilbert Big Machine Brickyard 400. After avoiding several crashes by restarting at the very back, he finished 14th – the best finish so far for the team.

The team purchased a Richard Petty Motorsports car for Mark Thompson to drive the Daytona 500. Thompson would finish 22nd in the race, his best career cup series finish. The No. 66 car didn't return until the Bristol race in April, with Chad Finchum making his Cup debut. He started 38th and would end up 33rd after crashing out late in the race. The team returned with Hill starting at Kansas, running a handful of races throughout the season.

In 2019, it was announced that Joey Gase would be driving the No. 66 car in the Cup Series part-time, with engines that they acquired from the buyout of Triad Racing Technologies. Gase attempted to make the starting grid for the 2019 Daytona 500, but ultimately failed to qualify.

Timmy Hill made the starting lineup of the 2020 Daytona 500 after finishing 16th in Duel 2 of the 2020 Bluegreen Vacations Duels. That same year, Hill posted two top-20 finishes, one at Bristol and another at Talladega. 

In 2021, Hill returned full-time. However, after Hill was not invited to the eNASCAR iRacing Pro Invitational Series race at the Bristol Motor Speedway dirt track, the 66 team was not able to run the full season due to a lack of sponsorship. Although Hill got into the race, he was driving a Team Penske car, not an MBM car. Mike Marlar made his series debut at the Bristol dirt track, and Chad Finchum will drive the Ally 400. Stephen Leicht and Matt Jaskol could see seat time. Hill returned at the NASCAR Open at Texas Motor Speedway, with a chance of him being voted into the NASCAR All-Star Race. Hill returned for the first points-paying race since Atlanta in the 2021 Pocono Raceway doubleheader, finishing 35th and 37th. 

In 2022, Hill attempted to race the Daytona 500 with sponsor Bumper.com but failed to qualify.

Car No. 66 results

Xfinity Series

Car No. 13 history

In the team's debut, Long and White fielded the No. 13 car for Matt Carter; Carter finished 37th after retiring from the race for brake problems. Later in the year, MBM fielded rides in six races for White, Long and Mike Wallace, failing to qualify for four and not finishing any races. 

In 2015, the car was run with various drivers, some drivers used their old 2012 Toyota Camrys, due to the costs of updating their cars. Brad Teague made his final NASCAR start at the Food City 300, finishing 26th, although he used his old 2012 Toyota Camry. The team was noted for being the final in the Nationwide Series to use that body style.

The team returned in 2016, once again running with various drivers. Mark Thompson returned to the No. 13 at the Subway Firecracker 250, leading his first Xfinity Series lap during the race. It was announced on MBM's Facebook page in August that Timmy Hill had signed to drive with the team for the remainder of the 2016 season.

With the No. 66 taking over as the team's second full-time entry, the part-time entry was renumbered as No. 13. Team owner Carl Long drove some races in the car in 2018. 

In 2019, Max Tullman, Joe Nemechek and Tommy Joe Martins joined the team. The team's best finish was at Daytona with Tullman finishing 28th and the same finish with Long at Dover. 

In 2020, Chad Finchum drove most of the schedule in the 13. The team was more consistent, with their best finish being an 11th place finish at Talladega. 

In 2021, David Starr was announced to run almost the full schedule in the 13, but moved over to the 61 after Las Vegas. Loris Hezemans and Matt Jaskol both made their series debut that year. Starr was scheduled to return to the 13 at Mid-Ohio Sports Car Course, but replaced Stephen Leicht in the 61 since he failed to qualify in the 13 as there was no qualifying and Starr failed to qualify the last week at Charlotte Motor Speedway.

In  2022, the No. 13 was reduced to a partial schedule with multiple drivers such as Stan Mullis, Chad Finchum, Natalie Decker, Timmy Hill, Matt Jaskol, J. J. Yeley, Will Rodgers, and Akinori Ogata. Following Talladega MBM bought the owner points of RSS Racing's No. 28 and after 2 DNQs, Finchum finally managed to qualify the No. 13 for Dover. Matt Jaskol gave the No. 13's best finish so far, at 18th. At Daytona August race, Hill gave his team a best finish of second-place finish, beaten by another underdog race winner Jeremy Clements.

Car No. 13 results

Car No. 35 history

At the end of 2018, MBM Motorsports took over Go Green Racing's No. 35 team and driver Joey Gase. Gase had a best finish of 16th in the season opener at Daytona, then left at the end of the season to drive for Rick Ware Racing in the Cup Series.

Car No. 35 results

Car No. 40 history

In 2015, White and Long were joined by team owners Rick Ware and Curtis Key as partners, and the team expanded to two full-time cars with the No. 40. Derek White debuted the car in the Alert Today Florida 300 at Daytona International Speedway, finishing 22nd. This team was fielded as a start and park team to help fund the team's No. 13 car.

The team returned in 2016, once again filling a start and park role. NASCAR Next driver Alon Day made his Xfinity Series debut with the team at Mid-Ohio Sports Car Course; despite initial plans to drive the No. 13, he was moved to the No. 40 for the race. Day, the first Israeli driver to run a NASCAR national series race, qualified 22nd and took advantage of rainy conditions to begin running in the top ten. He finished 13th, the best finish for the No. 40 team since a 30th-place run at Talladega. 

In May 2017, Camping World Truck Series driver Austin Wayne Self joined the No. 40 for his Xfinity debut at Charlotte Motor Speedway. However, Long took over the No. 40 ride for the race, delaying Self's debut. At the June Dover International Speedway race, the No. 40 was the car driven by K&N Pro Series East driver Chad Finchum in his first NXS race.

Finchum became the full-time driver of the No. 40 in 2018. Team owner Carl Long took over the No. 40 at Homestead to race MBM's final Dodge in the fleet.

Car No. 40 results

Car No. 42 history
In 2019, MBM fielded the No. 42 car, following MBM's purchase of the defunct Chip Ganassi Racing No. 42 points.

In 2021, Chad Finchum ran the No. 42 car at the Tennessee Lottery 250 but failed to qualify. Timmy Hill would attempt to qualify this car in the Henry 180. Later on, Whelen Euro series driver from Switzerland Giorgio Maggi attempted the Pennzoil 150 but failed to qualify.

Car No. 42 results

Car No. 61 history

In the Food City 300 at Bristol, the No. 42 car was renumbered to No. 61 in a partnership with Hattori Racing Enterprises; Timmy Hill drove the No. 61 to a career-best seventh. 

In 2020, Timmy Hill drove most races in the #61, with Austin Hill and Finchum returning. At Kansas, Austin Hill another top 5 finish, finishing 5th. 

In 2021, Robby Lyons, Stephen Leicht, and Chad Finchum drive for the first 4 races of the season. At Phoenix, David Starr moved from the 13 to the 61 to run most races. Austin Hill himself drove for 5 races. Matt Jaskol, Boris Said, C. J. McLaughlin, Bubba Wallace, Loris Hezemans, and Timmy Hill drove the 61 for one race. The 61 did not return in 2022.

Car No. 61 results

Car No. 66 history

The team fielded to No. 66 for 2018 season, with Timmy Hill driving. At the 2018 Coca-Cola Firecracker 250, Hill finished seventh, his best finish since 2012 (both at Daytona). Chad Finchum, who usually ran the No. 40, switched to No. 66 at Homestead-Miami Speedway as Long was in the No. 40.

In 2020, Hill kicked off the season with a 3rd-place finish at Daytona. Hill also got two other top-20 finishes, at Talladega and Charlotte Roval. 

In 2021, Hill was announced to drive the No. 66 full-time. However, Matt Jaskol drove for 4 races, David Starr for 11 races, C. J. McLaughlin for one race, Jason White for 2 superspeedway races, and Loris Hezemans for one race.

In 2022, Timmy Hill was originally going to return to the No. 66 for Daytona, but J. J. Yeley had more sponsorship. He had continued for the following few races. Later on, in a Twitter post, MBM announced that J. J. Yeley will drive the No. 66 full-time.

Car No. 66 results

Car No. 72 history
The No. 72 car was fielded as a start and park team to help fund the team's No. 13 car in the team's early stages. After a one-year hiatus, the team made its first attempt at the 2016 Darlington race. John Jackson raced the No. 72 at Darlington, finishing 39th. Timmy Hill attempted to get the car into the fall Kentucky race, but failed to qualify and took over the No. 13 for Mark Thompson. The team returned for two races in 2017, once again running as a start and park entry.

Car No. 72 results

ARCA Racing Series
On November 28, 2016, MBM announced plans for Mark Thompson to race at the 2017 season-opening Lucas Oil 200 ARCA Racing Series race at Daytona; the race was rumored to be Thompson's final ARCA start, but he returned for the Talladega event in May. Driving the No. 66 Phoenix Air Ford, Thompson qualified 15th, but finished 31st after he was collected in a nine-car accident on lap 49.

Car No. 66 results

References

External links
 
 
 

NASCAR teams
American companies established in 2014
Auto racing teams established in 2014